David Ricardo Racero Mayorca (born 11 October 1986) is a Colombian politician, he holds a B.A. in philosophy. He has been elected as the representative for Bogotá in the Chamber of Representatives of Colombia for the periods 2018–2022 and 2022–2026. Since 20 July 2022, he has been the president of the Chamber. 

He has a master's degree in Economic Sciences from the National University of Colombia and finished a PhD in Political Studies and International Relations at the same university.

References 

|-

1986 births
Living people
21st-century Colombian politicians
Members of the Chamber of Representatives of Colombia
Presidents of the Chamber of Representatives of Colombia
National University of Colombia alumni
Politicians from Bogotá